The KTM 690 Enduro is a dual sport motorcycle made by KTM since 2008. The KTM 690 Enduro R was introduced in 2009, differing from the basic 'E' models by having an orange frame, different styling and 20 mm longer suspension travel, thus being 20 mm higher.

Although labelled 690 the displacement for bikes from 2008-2011 is actually 654cc. In 2012 KTM introduced a true 690cc 690, discontinued the 'E' model and lowered the suspension and thus seat height of the 'R' model to that of the previous 'E' model.  Other 2012 changes included an improved headlight and the inclusion of a tachometer.  In 2014, ABS brakes (front and rear) were made standard, a dual-spark head introduced and ride-by-wire throttle.

References

External links
Official KTM model information

690 Enduro
Off-road motorcycles
Motorcycles introduced in 2008
Dual-sport motorcycles